The Salem River is a  tributary of the Delaware River in southwestern New Jersey in the United States.

The course and watershed of the Salem River are entirely within Salem County. Tributaries of the Salem include Game Creek, Mannington Creek, and Fenwick Creek. The river rises in Upper Pittsgrove Township and flows initially westwardly, through Pilesgrove Township and the borough of Woodstown and along the boundaries of Carneys Point and Mannington Townships. Near Deepwater it approaches to within  of the Delaware River, a distance breached by the Salem (Deepwater) Canal, which connects the two rivers. From there the Salem River turns to the south, flowing along the boundary of Mannington and Pennsville Townships, where it widens into a meandering shallow estuary, Kates Creek Meadow, and passes the city of Salem, its head of navigability.

The Delaware and the Salem are tidal. The shipping channel of the Salem River is much shallower, making the city a low draft port, which prohibits use by Handymax class ships.

According to the Geographic Names Information System, the river has also been known historically as Firkins Creek, Varkens Kill, and Varkins Kill (Hogg Creek). The Board on Geographic Names settled on "Salem River" as the stream's name in 1940. The estuary was inhabited by Lenape at the time of European colonization. In 1641, emigrants from the New Haven Colony  settled along the Varkens Kill. Fort Elfsborg, a settlement of the New Sweden colony was constructed along the eastern bank of the Delaware near the mouth of the Salem in 1642–1643. The fort was later abandoned because of the prevalence of mosquitoes and the construction of Fort Casimir by the New Netherland Dutch across the river. In 1675, the village of Salem was founded near the mouth of the Salem river as part of the Fenwick Colony.

See also
List of New Jersey rivers

References

External links
Salem River gaging station at Woodsville

Tributaries of the Delaware River
Rivers of New Jersey
Rivers of Salem County, New Jersey